Journey is the fifth studio album by Australian singer songwriter Archie Roach. The album was the first studio album released by Roach on the Liberation Records label and was released in October 2007.

Journey was released as a companion piece to a documentary film called Liyarn Ngarn, made with Patrick Dodson and Pete Postlethwaite.

At the ARIA Music Awards of 2008, the album was nominated for ARIA Award for Best World Music Album.

Reception
Dave Clarke from Readings said "This record is intrinsically linked to a film called Liyarn Ngarn, a project he, British actor Pete Postlethwaite and Aboriginal leader and elder Patrick Dodson worked on. There is a mournfulness to these songs; I think it is probably as close to the Negro-Spiritual music of the African-American people that we're going to get in Australia. Songs of repression, repossession and hope for a better life. Archie Roach has a beautiful rich voice but the thing that strikes me most when I listen to this is the pain in his voice. The voice of a man who has suffered much but continues his search for justice. And for peace."

Track listing

Release history

References

2007 albums
Archie Roach albums
Liberation Records albums